The Silver Logie for Most Outstanding Miniseries or Telemovie is an award presented annually at the Australian TV Week Logie Awards. The award is given to recognise an outstanding Australian single drama, miniseries or telemovie. The winner and nominees of this award are chosen by television industry juries.

Nominees in this category had previously been included in the Logie Award for Most Outstanding Drama Series which was first awarded at the 3rd Annual TV Week Logie Awards ceremony, held in 1961 as Best Australian Drama. The award was renamed many times in subsequent ceremonies; Best Australian TV Drama Series (1962), Best Drama (1963, 1966–1967), Best Australian Drama Series (1965, 1970), Best Drama Series (1968), and Best Drama Show (1969). This award category was eliminated in 1977.

Awards were given for Best Single Dramatic Production in 1978, Best Single Drama in 1979 to 1981, and Best Single Drama or Mini Series from 1982 to 1985.

At the 33rd Annual TV Week Logie Awards in 1991, an industry voted award for drama returned, originally called Most Outstanding Single Drama or Miniseries. It has also been known as Most Outstanding Series (1992–1993, 1998), Most Outstanding Achievement in Drama Production (1994–1997) and Most Outstanding Drama Series, Miniseries or Telemovie (2007–2012).

In 2013, the categories were split into Most Outstanding Drama Series and Most Outstanding Miniseries or Telemovie. Miniseries Howzat! Kerry Packer's War was the inaugural winner of this standalone category.

Winners and nominees

Listed below are the winners of the award for each year for Best Australian Drama.

Listed below are the winners of the award for each year, as well as the other nominees for Most Outstanding Single Drama or Miniseries or Most Outstanding Drama Series.

Listed below are the winners of the award for each year, as well as the other nominees for Most Outstanding Miniseries or Telemovie.

See also
 Logie Award for Most Popular Drama Program
 Logie Award for Most Outstanding Comedy Program
 Logie Award for Most Popular Comedy Program

References

External links

Awards established in 1991

1991 establishments in Australia